Joanna Christine Day (born 4 September 1975) is an Irish former cricketer who played as a wicket-keeper and right-handed batter. She appeared in six One Day Internationals for Ireland between 2004 and 2006, including being part of the side's squad at the 2005 World Cup.

References

External links
 
 

1975 births
Living people
Cricketers from Dublin (city)
Irish women cricketers
Ireland women One Day International cricketers